Hans Kleinpeter (1 February 1936 – December 2004) was a Swiss bobsledder. He competed in the four-man event at the 1964 Winter Olympics.

References

1936 births
2004 deaths
Swiss male bobsledders
Olympic bobsledders of Switzerland
Bobsledders at the 1964 Winter Olympics
Sportspeople from Zürich
20th-century Swiss people